The 1912 Ottawa Rough Riders finished in 2nd place in the Interprovincial Rugby Football Union with a 4–2 record and failed to qualify for the playoffs.

Regular season

Standings

Schedule

References

Ottawa Rough Riders seasons